Thomas Marshall may refer to:

Politicians
Thomas Marshall (fl. 1376), MP for Somerset
Thomas Marshall (fl. 1421), MP for Kingston upon Hull
Thomas Marshall (Virginia politician, born 1730) (1730–1802), American politician and soldier, father of U.S. Supreme Court Chief Justice John Marshall
Thomas Marshall (Virginia politician, born 1784) (1784–1835), grandson of above and Virginia delegate
Thomas Marshall (Canadian politician) (1864–1951), also known as Thomas A. Marshall, MLA in Ontario, Canada
Thomas Alexander Marshall (1794–1871), former U.S. Representative from Kentucky
Thomas Frank Marshall (1854–1921), U.S. Representative from North Dakota, 1901–1909
Thomas Francis Marshall (1801–1864), U.S. Representative from Kentucky, 1841–1843
Thomas R. Marshall (1854–1925), vice president under Woodrow Wilson, 1913–1921
Thomas C. Marshall (1851–1911), pioneer, lawyer, judge, and mayor of Missoula, Montana
Thomas Marshall (Illinois politician) (1817–1873), Lieutenant Governor of Illinois
Thomas Marshall (Maine politician) (1826–1861), American politician and military commander from Maine

Religious figures
Thomas Marshall (Abbot of Colchester) (died 1539), Roman Catholic priest
Thomas Marshall (Dean of Gloucester) (1621–1685), English scholar and Anglican priest

Military
Thomas Marshall (general) (1793–1853), brigadier general of volunteers during the Mexican–American War
Thomas W. Marshall Jr. (1906–1942), officer in the United States Navy 1930–1942

Sportsmen
Thomas Roger Marshall (1849–1913), Scottish rugby player
Thomas Marshall (footballer, born 1858) (1858–1917), England international footballer from the 1880s
Thomas Marshall (footballer, fl. 1898–1906), played for Bolton Wanderers and Burnley in the 1900s

Others
Thomas Marshall (songwriter) (c. 1806 – 1866), Newcastle-born songwriter
Thomas Humphrey Marshall (1893–1981), British sociologist
Thomas William Marshall (controversialist) (1818–1877), Catholic controversialist
Thomas William Marshall (painter) (1875–1914), English painter
Thomas Ansell Marshall (1827–1903), English reverend and entomologist
Thomas Falcon Marshall (1818–1878), English artist
Thomas Marshall (died 1900), Flannan Isles lighthouse keeper who famously disappeared without trace
Thomas H. Marshall, author of The Irish Necromancer published in 1821
One of Whitey Bulger's aliases

See also
Tom Marshall (disambiguation)